Abraham Markle (October 26, 1770 – March 6, 1826) was a businessman and political figure in Upper Canada and co-proprietor of Terre Haute, Indiana.

He was born in Ulster County, New York in 1770. Four of his brothers served with Butler's Rangers during the American Revolution; they settled at Newark (Niagara-on-the-Lake) after the war and he joined them for a time, but he later moved back to New York state. In 1806, he established a distillery at Ancaster in Upper Canada. In 1812, he was elected to the 6th Parliament of Upper Canada representing West York. In 1811, he had refused to serve with the Lincoln Militia. In 1813, with Joseph Willcocks, he opposed the suspension of habeas corpus in the province. In June of that year, he was imprisoned because he had been accused of treason. He was released and by December had joined the American side in the War of 1812. He was involved in a number of raids against settlements in Upper Canada. After the war, he settled in Vigo County, Indiana and was one of the original proprietors of the Terre Haute Company which platted the village of Terre Haute. He built and operated a mill on Otter Creek north of that village and became involved in other businesses in the area.

He died in 1826 while working on his farm there, apparently due to a stroke.

References

External links 
 
Abraham Markle collection, Rare Books and Manuscripts, Indiana State Library

1 History of Markle's Mill

Members of the Legislative Assembly of Upper Canada
Canadian people of the War of 1812
1770 births
1826 deaths
British defectors to the United States
People from Ulster County, New York
People from Vigo County, Indiana